[[File:Elandy.png|thumb|''Savannahs workhorse, the ubiquitous Eland armoured car]]
The South African Defence Force deployed a number of Combat Groups comprising South African and Angolan elements during Operation Savannah (Angola).  Initially, only Combat Groups A and B were deployed, with the remaining groups being mobilised and deployed into Angola later in the campaign.  There has been much dispute the overall size of Task Force Zulu.  Current evidence indicates that the Task Force started with approximately 500 men and grew to a total of 2,900 with the formation of Battle Groups Foxbat, Orange and X-Ray.

Note: Armoured cars and artillery batteries were frequently reassigned between Combat Groups depending on the nature of the task on hand.

Task Force Zulu

 Task force commander: Col Koos van Heerden
 Combat Group Alpha Commander: Cmdt. Dellville Lindford until 20 December 1975, thereafter Cmdt. P.C. Myburgh
 1x Fletcha Battalion 
 1x Caprivi Bushman Company
 1x Angolan Bushman Company
 2x Troops Eland-90 armoured cars
 1x 81mm mortar platoon
 1x Battery 140mm artillery
 Combat Group Bravo'''
 Commander:  Cmdt. Jan Breytenbach
 1x Battalion Chipenda faction ex FNLA soldiers
 3x Troop Eland-90 armoured Cars
 1x Troop 25-pound howitzer
 1x Battery (3 guns) 140mm howitzer

Independent Combat Groups

Foxbat
 Task force commander:  Cmdt. Eddie Webb (Maj H. Holtzhausen at time of establishment) and later Cmdt. George Kruys
 Several hundred UNITA soldiers
 3x Entac AT missile vehicles 
 3x UNITA AML-90 armoured cars
 2x Sabre Landrovers mounted with twin .50" Browning
 1x Squadron Eland 90 Armoured Cars

Orange
 Commander Cmdt. Dolf Carstens
 1x UNITA Battalion
 1x Motorised Infantry Company B Coy - 2 SAI
 1x Squadron Eland-90 armoured cars
 1xTroop 140mm artillery
 1x Platoon Medium Machine Gun HQ Coy - 2 SAI
 1x Company Zaire Army

X-Ray
 Commander: Capt. Fred Rindel
 1x UNITA Battalion
 1x SADF Infantry Company
 1x Squadron Eland-90 and Eland 60 armoured (22 cars) cars

References

Savannah
Savannah
Savannah
Savannah
Savannah (Angola), Operation
Conflicts in 1975
Conflicts in 1976
Cross-border operations
Military history of Angola
Orders of battle